"Frankie" is a song written by Howard Greenfield and Neil Sedaka and performed by Connie Francis featuring the Ray Ellis Orchestra. It reached #9 on the U.S. pop chart and #17 on the U.S. R&B chart in 1959.

The song ranked #61 on Billboard magazine's Top 100 singles of 1959.

The B-side to Francis' version, "Lipstick on Your Collar", reached #3 in the U.K., #5 on the U.S. pop chart, and #10 on the U.S. R&B chart in 1959.

References

1959 songs
1959 singles
Songs with lyrics by Howard Greenfield
Songs written by Neil Sedaka
Connie Francis songs
MGM Records singles